Lagos State Senior Model College Kankon is a state owned secondary school located along Owode-Apa road of Badagry LGA, Lagos State. It was founded in 1988 during the military administration of Rear Admiral  Mike Akhigbe (Rtd).

History
LSMC Kankon was one of the five model colleges established in each of the then five divisions of Lagos State. The school moved to its permanent site along Owode-Apa road on November 27, 1989. It was founded in 1988, along with four other model colleges under the military administration of Captain Okhai Mike Akhigbe, the then Military Governor of Lagos state. The College which was established along with four others took off at Government College,Ketu, Epe. The other four Model Colleges include Igbonla, Badore, Meiran and Igbokuta. From the period 1988-1992, the Colleges were given necessary foundation and focus on their mission as pacesetters in academics and co-curricular endeavours. The foundation Principal for Igbonla, Mr. James Akinola Paseda, doubled as the Co-ordinating Principal for the five Model Colleges at inception in February 1988. The pioneer Principal for Kankon was Mr. B.O. Owoade while the Vice-Principal was Mrs. M.O. Omoniyi.

2003 renaming 
Since 2003, the school was renamed to Lagos State Senior Model College, Kankon. The junior section of the school was no longer under the administrative control of the school.

Former principals
 Mr. B.O. Owoade, 1988 to 2005
 Chief Mrs. S.O.S. Olley, 2005 to 2011
 Mr. J.M. Ashaka, 2011 to 2013
Mr. S. O. Fadahunsi, 2013 till date

References

1988 establishments in Nigeria
Boarding schools in Nigeria
Secondary schools in Lagos State